Lesznowola  is a village in Piaseczno County, Masovian Voivodeship, in east-central Poland. It is the seat of the gmina (administrative district) called Gmina Lesznowola.

The village has a population of 400.

References

Lesznowola